The 2019–20 Liga Primera de Nicaragua season was divided into two tournaments (Apertura and Clausura) and will determine the 73rd and 74th champions in the history of the Liga Primera de Nicaragua, the top division of football in Nicaragua. The Apertura tournament was played in the second half of 2019, while the Clausura was played in the first half of 2020.

The league was one of the only football leagues in the world, along with the Belarus, that did not suspend their season due to the COVID-19 pandemic.

Format
The Apertura play-off format was changed from previous years, while the Clausura will use the same 4-team play-off format. For the Apertura, the top four teams from the regular stage advanced to a "quadrangular" double-round robin instead of a play-off stage. The regular stage and quadrangular winners would have played to decide the tournament's champion, but ultimately the same team won both and the final was not necessary. The same format was recently adopted by the Costa Rican Primera División, but for both half seasons.

Team information 

A total of ten teams contested the league, including nine sides from the 2018–19 Primera División, and one side from the 2018–19 Segunda División.

UNAN Managua finished last in the aggregate table and were relegated to the Segunda División. The champions from the Segunda División, Deportivo Las Sabanas were promoted in their place.

The 9th place team in the aggregate table, Chinandega FC, faced the second place team from the Segunda División, FC Gutiérrez, in a playoff for a spot in the Primera División. Chinandega won 4–3 over two legs, meaning Chinandega remained in Primera División.

Promotion and relegation 

Promoted from Segunda División as of July, 2019.

 Champions: Deportivo Las Sabanas

Relegated to Segunda División  as of July, 2019.

 Last Place: UNAN Managua

Stadia and locations

Managerial changes

During the Apertura season

Between the Aperutra and Clasura season

Apertura

Personnel and sponsoring

Standings

Results

Finals

Bracket 

Key: (a) = Wins because of away goals rule, (a.e.t.) = Wins after extra time in second leg, (p) = Wins after penalty shoot-out.

Quarterfinals 

Managua progressed.

Real Estelí progressed.

Semi-finals 

 1–1, Real Estelí won on away goals.

 4–4, Managua won 5–3 on penalties.

Final 

 Real Estelí won 2–1 on aggregate.

Statistics

Top scorers

Records 
 Top goalscorer: Mexican Carlos Felix (10 goals)
 Most goals scored: Managua FC (35 goals)
 Fewest goals scored: ART Jalapa (12 goals)
 Fewest goals conceded : Walter Ferretti and Real Esteli (14 goals)
 Most goals conceded : Chinandega (30 goals)

Clausura

Personnel and sponsoring

Standings

Results

Finals

Bracket 

Key: (a) = Wins because of away goals rule, (a.e.t.) = Wins after extra time in second leg, (p) = Wins after penalty shoot-out.

Quarterfinals 

Diriangén progressed.

Walter Ferretti progressed.

Semi-finals 

 Real Estelí won 1–0 on aggregate.

Managua won 4–2 on aggregate.

Final 

Real Estelí won 4–2 on aggregate.

Statistics

Top scorers

Discipline
 Most yellow cards: 8
  Daniel Rodríguez (Chinandega)

 Most red cards: 2
  Jonathan Moncada (Deportivo Ocotal)

Aggregate table

Relegation play-offs

List of foreign players in the league 
This is a list of foreign players in the 2019–20 season. The following players:

 Have played at least one game for the respective club.
 Have not been capped for the Nicaragua national football team on any level, independently from the birthplace

A new rule was introduced this season, that clubs can have four foreign players per club and can only add a new player if there is an injury or a player/s is released and it is before the close of the season transfer window.

ART Jalapa
  Gabriel Coelho
  Ronaldo Pabon
  Juan Daniel González 
  Edder Mondragón 
  Eder García

Chinandega
  Brayan Cañate
  Marlon Barrios
  Esteban Lozada
  Duver Quinonez
  Cristhian Izaguirre

Diriangén
  Carlos Tórres 
  Miguel Angel Pucharella
  Yeison Esquivel 
  Bernardo Gradilla
  Jorge Vargas Palacio
  Bernando Laureiro

Juventus Managua
  Lucas Reynoso 
  Rafael de Almeida 
  Robinson Luiz 
  Rafael Vieira 
  Armando Valdez 
  Alexander Moreno
  Héctor "El Tanque"Vega
  Fernando Insaurralde

Managua
  Cristiano Fernández da Lima
  Marel Álvarez
  Carlos Felix Gámez 
  Rodolfo Forbes 
  Pablo Gállego 
  Sandro Cutino

Ocotal
  Allan Gutiérrez
  Kenverlen López
  Brayan Cantillo Lucumi 
  Diego Arismendi 
  Jerney Vente
  Miguel Batalla
  Kevin Meraz

Real Estelí
  Lucio Barroca
  Vinicius da Souza 
  Jesús Leal 
  Marco Granados 
  Jaime Ayala 
  Taufic Guarch
  Fabrizio Tavano

Real Madriz
  Daniel Suazo Guerrero
  Pedro Aguirre
  Josué Ramírez Asprilla 
  Fernando Ramírez Pahua
  Andres Garzon
  Bryan Viveros

Deportivo Las Sabanas
  Carlos Mosquera
  Edson Contreras
  Luis Carbajal
  Rogelio Espinoza

Walter Ferretti
  Rodrigo Hernández 
  Jefferson de Araujo 
  Leandro Figueroa
  Pedro Dos Santos
  Fernando Villalpando
  Nikita Solodchenko
  Juan Camilio Rodriguez

 (player released during the Apertura season)
 (player released between the Apertura and Clausura seasons)
 (player released during the Clausura season)

References

Nicaraguan Primera División seasons
1
Nicaragua